A radio-frequency quadrupole (RFQ) beam cooler is a device for particle beam cooling, especially suited for ion beams. It lowers the temperature of a particle beam by reducing its energy dispersion and emittance, effectively increasing its brightness (brilliance). The prevalent mechanism for cooling in this case is buffer-gas cooling, whereby the beam loses energy from collisions with a light, neutral and inert gas (typically helium). The cooling must take place within a confining field in order to counteract the thermal diffusion that results from the ion-atom collisions.

The quadrupole mass analyzer (a radio frequency quadrupole used as a mass filter) was invented by Wolfgang Paul in the late 1950s to early 60s at the University of Bonn, Germany. Paul shared the 1989 Nobel Prize in Physics for his work. Samples for mass analysis are ionized, for example by laser (matrix-assisted laser desorption/ionization) or discharge (electrospray or inductively coupled plasma) and the resulting beam is sent through the RFQ and "filtered" by scanning the operating parameters (chiefly the RF amplitude).  This gives a mass spectrum, or fingerprint, of the sample.  Residual gas analyzers use this principle as well.

Applications of ion cooling to nuclear physics

Despite its long history, high-sensitivity high-accuracy mass measurements of atomic nuclei continue to be very important areas of research for many branches of physics. Not only do these measurements provide a better understanding of nuclear structures and nuclear forces but they also offer insight into how matter behaves in some of Nature's harshest environments. At facilities such as ISOLDE at CERN and TRIUMF in Vancouver, for instance, measurement techniques are now being extended to short-lived radionuclei that only occur naturally in the interior of exploding stars. Their short half-lives and very low production rates at even the most powerful facilities require the very highest in sensitivity of such measurements.

Penning traps, the central element in modern high-accuracy high-sensitivity mass measurement installations, enable measurements of accuracies approaching 1 part in 10^11 on single ions. However, to achieve this Penning traps must have the ion to be measured delivered to it very precisely and with certainty that it is indeed the desired ion. This imposes severe requirements on the apparatus that must take the atomic nucleus out of the target in which it has been created, sort it from the myriad of other ions that are emitted from the target and then direct it so that it can be captured in the measurement trap.

Cooling these ion beams, particularly radioactive ion beams, has been shown to drastically improve the accuracy and sensitivity of mass measurements by reducing the phase space of the ion collections in question. Using a light neutral background gas, typically helium, charged particles originating from on-line mass separators undergo a number of soft collisions with the background gas molecules resulting in fractional losses of the ions' kinetic energy and a reduction of the ion ensemble's overall energy. In order for this to be effective however, the ions need to be contained using transverse radiofrequency quadrupole (RFQ) electric fields during the collisional cooling process (also known as buffer gas cooling).  These RFQ coolers operate on the same principles as quadrupole ion traps and have been shown to be particularly well suited for buffer gas cooling given their capacity for total confinement of ions having a large dispersion of velocities, corresponding to kinetic energies up to tens of electron volts. A number of the RFQ coolers have already been installed at research facilities around the world and a list of their characteristics can be found below.

List of facilities containing RFQ Coolers

See also
 Quadrupole mass analyzer

References

Bibliography

External links
LEBIT Project NSCL/MSU
ISOLTRAP Experimental Setup
TITAN: TRIUMF's Ion Trap for Atomic and Nuclear science
TRIMP – Trapped Radioactive Isotopes: Micro-laboratories for fundamental Physics
The SHIPTRAP Experiment
The ISCOOL project

Measuring instruments
Mass spectrometry
Accelerator physics